Peter Ng may refer to:

 Peter Huang (黃文雄, born 1937), Taiwanese activist for democratization and human rights
 Peter B. K. Ng (Peter B. K. Ng, born 1947), horse trainer in Hong Kong
 Peter Ng (tong member), member of the Joe Boys and perpetrator of the Golden Dragon massacre in San Francisco Chinatown
 Peter Kee Lin Ng, marine biologist at NUS